KNAB may refer to:

 KNAB (AM), a radio station (1140 AM) licensed to Burlington, Colorado, United States
 KNAB-FM, a radio station (104.1 FM) licensed to Burlington, Colorado, United States
 Corruption Prevention and Combating Bureau in Latvia
Kohanimeandmebaas, a database of place names maintained by the Institute of the Estonian Language, and its accompanying transliteration system

See also
 Knab, a Dutch bank operated by Aegon N.V.